Mallotus mollissimus is a rainforest plant in the spurge family. Indigenous to Queensland and Malesia.

References

mollissimus
Flora of Malesia
Flora of Queensland
Malpighiales of Australia